Misrikh  Assembly constituency is one of the 403 constituencies of the Uttar Pradesh Legislative Assembly,  India. It is a part of the Sitapur district and one  of the five assembly constituencies in the Misrikh Lok Sabha constituency. First election in this assembly constituency was held in 1952 after the "DPACO (1951)" (delimitation order) was passed in 1951. After the "Delimitation of Parliamentary and Assembly Constituencies Order" was passed in 2008, the constituency was assigned identification number 153.

Wards  / Areas
Extent  of Misrikh Assembly constituency is KCs Mishrikh, Machhrehata, Aurangabad  & Misrikh- CumNeemsar MB of Mishrikh Tehsil.

Members of the Legislative Assembly

16th Vidhan Sabha: 2012 General  Elections

See also

Misrikh Lok Sabha constituency
Sitapur district
Sixteenth Legislative Assembly of Uttar Pradesh
Uttar Pradesh Legislative Assembly
Vidhan Bhawan

References

External links
 

Assembly constituencies of Uttar Pradesh
Politics of Sitapur district